Wazoo may refer to:

 The Grand Wazoo, 1972 album by Frank Zappa
 Wazoo (album), 2007 live album by Frank Zappa
 Wazoo (candy), candy bar made by  Topps incorporated
 WaZOO (Warp Zillion Opus-to-Opus), the session layer protocol for FidoNet
 Wazoo Sports Network, a local sports channel serving Kentucky and southern Indiana

See also 
 Wazzo
 Wazzu
 Wazu (disambiguation)